Steen Spore (born 27 April 1938) is a Danish official who was the second High Commissioner of Greenland, holding this position from 1 August 1992 to 1 July 1995. After his departure, he became a 1st order knight of the Order of the Dannebrog.

References

Living people
1938 births
Place of birth missing (living people)
20th-century Danish politicians
High Commissioners of Greenland